The Taiwan Music Institute (TMI) is a musical institute in Taiwan. It is headquartered at Taiwan Traditional Theatre Center.

History
The institute was originally established by the Council for Cultural Affairs in 1990 as the Center of Ethnic Music. In 2002, it was placed under the National Center for Traditional Arts and renamed the Ethnic Music Research Institute. In 2008, it was renamed again into Center of Taiwan Music. In May 2012, it was renamed Taiwan Music Institute when Council for Cultural Affairs was upgraded to the Ministry of Culture.

See also
 Music of Taiwan

References

External links

 

1990 establishments in Taiwan
Music organizations based in Taiwan
Organizations based in Taipei
Organizations established in 1990